Pandanus odorifer is an aromatic monocot species of plant in the family Pandanaceae, native to Polynesia, Australia, South Asia (Andaman Islands), and the Philippines, and is also found wild in southern India and Burma. It is commonly known as fragrant screw-pine.

Names
In addition to screw-pine, other common English names for the tree include kewda, fragrant screwpine, umbrella tree and screw tree.

In India, the tree goes by a variety of names, many deriving from the Sanskrit kētakī. in Malayalam called pookkaitha and its flower known as thaazhampoo, In Tamil, it is called kaithai (கைதை) and tāḻai (தாழை) and both are mentioned in Sangam literature. In Arabic-speaking countries, the tree is referred to as al-kādī.  In Japan, the tree is called adan and grows on Okinawa Islands, as well as the Tokara Islands, Amami Ōshima and Kikaijima.

P. odorifer grows widely at the St. Martin's Island  of Bangladesh, although many have been destroyed by mass tourism initiatives.

Description
It is a small branched, palm-like dioecious tree with a flexuous trunk supported by brace roots. The tree can grow to a height of 4 meters. Leaves grow in clusters at the branch tips, with rosettes of sword-shaped, stiff  (leather-like) and spiny bluish-green, fragrant leaves. Leaves are glaucous, 40–70 cm. long.  In summer, the tree bears very fragrant flowers, used as perfume. Interestingly, Pandanus lacks a common callose wall around microspore tetrads during pollen development. In Yemen, they are predominantly found alongside flowing streams in the western escarpment foothills; Most common in high rainfall areas. The fragrant male flowers are wrapped in leaves and sold on roadsides and in markets. Only male plants seem to occur in Yemen. Some suggest that it was introduced into Yemen from India where its flowers are used chiefly to make perfume.

Propagation
The tree is propagated vegetatively, by the offshoots of young plants that grow around the base of the trunk, but may also be increased by seed. If by the former method, the offshoots should be cut off and set in sand, at a temperature of 65° to 70°F. The cuttings root slowly, and the plants for a time grow very slowly. The general treatment required for culturing the screw-pine is similar to that of palms. Trees require an abundance of water in summer.

According to Ibn al-'Awwam's 12th-century treatise on agriculture, the kadi is cultivated in a manner similar to that of the Judas tree (Cercis siliquastrum).

Other uses
An aromatic oil called kewra and a fragrant distillate called keorra-ka-arak are extracted from the male flowers. They are almost exclusively used in the form of a watery distillate called kewra water. Its flowers have a sweet, perfumed odor that has a pleasant quality similar to rose flowers, although kewra is considered more fruity. The watered-down distillate is quite diluted; it can be used by the tablespoon, often even by the teaspoon.

The ketaki tree's flower is never used as an offering to the god Shiva. According to Hindu mythology, Shiva cursed the flower that it will never be used to worship him for helping Brahma lie against him, and then to Brahma that he will not be worshipped by people.

On Ishigaki Island, south-west of Okinawa, it is customary to use parts of the plant during Bon festivities as an offering. The soft shoots can also be eaten, although the taste is very astringent and the shoots are considered inedible without blanching them first. When they are properly treated however, the taste is similar to that of bamboo shoots. 

Despite the pineapple-like appearance of the fruit and its sweet aroma, it is very fibrous and while being non-toxic, is generally not considered for consumption.

Gallery

See also
 Domesticated plants and animals of Austronesia

References

odorifer